Harry Howard (30 June 1885 – 18 September 1960) was an Australian cricketer. He played twenty first-class matches for Western Australia between 1905/06 and 1924/25.

See also
 List of Western Australia first-class cricketers

References

External links
 

1885 births
1960 deaths
Australian cricketers
Western Australia cricketers
Cricketers from Adelaide